St. Mother Teresa High School is a Catholic secondary school in the Nepean district of Ottawa, Ontario, Canada. It supports grades 7–12. The name of its sports team is the 'Titans'. The motto of the school is Amor et Dignitas or "love and dignity."

Sports
Mother Teresa has many sports teams, including alpine skiing, badminton, baseball (does not have a team every year), basketball, cross country running, field hockey, golf, handball, hockey, Nordic skiing, rugby, Ski Club, soccer, softball, field lacrosse, swimming, Touch Football, football, track and field, varsity girls' rugby, varsity girls touch football, volleyball, weight room, and wrestling.

On May 28, 2014, the OFSAA division baseball team won the NCSSAA city championship giving the school its seventh city championship win of the school year.

Arts
Mother Teresa's Drama Department put on a production of twinkly stars in 2015. The production was nominated for 16 Cappies awards in total.

Population
The population of Mother Teresa is currently approximately 1500 students. The population has been steadily increasing with the increasing population of the sub-urban Barrhaven community. As much as it is a Catholic school, Mother Teresa is proud to be home to students of many different religions, ethnicities, and cultures from around the world which make up a tremendous part of its school spirit and heart.

Academics
High school subjects include: Mathematics (functions, calculus, etc.), English at all levels, French, Biology, Chemistry, Physics, Religion (mandatory for Catholic school diploma), Business Studies (accounting, management, marketing, etc.), Technology, Computer Science, Media Arts including broadcasting and animation, Parenting, Hospitality, Automotive and construction technology, Politics (not every year), World Issues (as of 2013), Sociology, and a variety of personal development and learning courses.

Clubs and trips
Mother Teresa supports many clubs and holds many trips. Clubs include Theatre (a drama production is held every year), Reach for the Top, Outdoor Club, Tax, Enrichment Program, and Red Maple Reading (offered to students in Grades 7 and 8). Mother Teresa's students are also encouraged to take part in one or more of the school's many trips, including the Stratford Festival Trip and its marine biology trip to St. Andrew's, NB.

2011 Explosion
On May 26, 2011, an empty barrel of peppermint oil exploded in an auto-shop class, killing 18-year-old student Eric Leighton, a hockey player with the Almonte Thunder. as well as causing minor injuries to four other students and one staff member.

Renaming
On 4 September 2016, the school's patron Mother Teresa was canonized into Sainthood by Pope Francis. She is now referred to as Saint Teresa of Calcutta in the Catholic Church. The Ottawa Catholic School Board decided to rename the high school, St. Mother Teresa Catholic High School to keep with tradition.

See also
List of high schools in Ontario
List of Ottawa schools

References
150 years of Catholic Education in Ottawa-Carleton 1856-2006, Ottawa-Carleton Catholic School Board, 2006
.

External links
 Official website

High schools in Ottawa
Catholic secondary schools in Ontario
Educational institutions established in 1998
1998 establishments in Ontario
Middle schools in Ottawa